Jeremiah Turbidy   (July 4, 1852 – September 5, 1920) was a 19th-century professional baseball player. He played for the Kansas City Cowboys of the Union Association in 1884.

External links

1852 births
1920 deaths
Major League Baseball shortstops
Kansas City Cowboys (UA) players
19th-century baseball players
Binghamton Crickets (1880s) players
Worcester Grays players
Baseball players from Massachusetts